Eucosmogastra kontumica is a moth of the family Tortricidae. It is found in Vietnam.

The wingspan is 13.5 mm. The ground colour of the forewings is orange spotted black. The markings consist of larger spots forming postbasal, median and subterminal fasciae. There are additional spots and dots between those elements. The hindwings are orange broadly edged with blackish brown.

Etymology
The specific name refers to the type locality.

References

Moths described in 2009
Enarmoniini
Moths of Asia
Taxa named by Józef Razowski